The American Institute for Free Labor Development (AIFLD) was established in late 1961 by the AFL–CIO in the western hemisphere. It received funding from the US government, mostly through USAID (United States Agency for International Development). In the 1980s, it began receiving funds from the NED (National Endowment for Democracy), which is funded through the USAID budget of the U.S. State Department. AIFLD was merged with three similar organizations into the American Center for International Labor Solidarity.

American Center for International Labor Solidarity (1997) 
In October 1995, John Sweeney succeeded Thomas R. Donahue as President of the AFL–CIO. Sweeney merged AIFLD with three other institutes to form the American Center for International Labor Solidarity. The archives of the merged center are available at the University of Maryland Special Collections and University Archives.

See also 
Free Trade Union Committee

References

Further reading 
 Lodge, George C. (1962). Spearheads of Democracy: Labor in the Developing Countries. Harper & Row for the Council on Foreign Relations: New York. ASIN B0006AY0AU

External links 
FreeLabors Business Blog
AFL–CIO
Trade unions established in 1962
International development agencies